Anthony Wayne Wallace (born 7 August 1968) is a Jamaican sprinter. He competed in the men's 400 metres at the 1992 Summer Olympics.

References

External links
 

1968 births
Living people
Athletes (track and field) at the 1992 Summer Olympics
Jamaican male sprinters
Olympic athletes of Jamaica
Place of birth missing (living people)